The 1999–2000 Maryland Terrapins men's basketball team represented the University of Maryland in the 1999–2000 college basketball season as a member of the Atlantic Coast Conference (ACC). The team was led by head coach Gary Williams and played their home games at the Cole Field House. They lost to UCLA in the 2000 NCAA tournament.

Pre-season

Accolades
Team
ESPN/USA Today ranked No. 23

Terence Morris
Preseason All-American
Wooden Award Candidate
Preseason ACC Player of the year

Roster

Season Recap 

The Terrapins opened their season with a victory over San Francisco in the Preseason NIT – Gary Williams' 400th career win.  They beat Tulane in the preseason tournament before losing to Kentucky in the semifinals. They defeated Notre Dame in the consolation game.

They would go on to win all of their non-conference home games, extending their home out of conference winning streak to 72 games. Maryland did not lose a non-conference game in Cole Field house in the 1990s.

The team lost its ACC opener at NC State and dropped two more to begin league play 0-3. After the poor start in conference, however, the Terrapins went 11-2 over the remainder of the season to finish 2nd in the ACC. The Terrapins' signature victory of the season came when they defeated #3 Duke in Cameron Indoor Stadium, ending an 18-game win streak, 46-game home winning streak, and 31-game ACC home winning streak for the Blue Devils. Following the win, Maryland students rioted on the College Park campus.

In the ACC Tournament, the team advanced to the championship game, where they lost to Duke.

Receiving a #3 seed in the 2000 NCAA Tournament, the Terrapins defeated #14 seed Iona 74-59. However, in the second round Williams' team looked "helpless" as #6 seed UCLA put on an offensive showcase and won easily 105-70, one of the worst tournament losses in Maryland history.

In the summer of 2000, the University of Maryland broke ground on the Comcast Center.

Accolades
Juan Dixon1st Team All-Acc
Lonny Baxter1st Team All-ACC
Steve BlakeAll-ACC honorable mention

Schedule

|-
!colspan=8| Exhibition

|-
!colspan=8| Regular season

|-
!colspan=8| ACC tournament

|-
!colspan=8| 2000 NCAA men's basketball tournament

References

Maryland Terrapins men's basketball seasons
Maryland
Maryland
Maryland
Maryland